The EAA Aviation Museum, formerly the EAA AirVenture Museum (or Air Adventure Museum), is a museum dedicated to the preservation and display of historic and experimental aircraft as well as antiques, classics, and warbirds. The museum is located in Oshkosh, Wisconsin, United States, adjacent to Wittman Regional Airport, home of the museum's sponsoring organization, the Experimental Aircraft Association (EAA), and the organization's EAA AirVenture Oshkosh event (the world's biggest fly-in and airshow) that takes place in late July/early August.

With over 200 aircraft, indoors and outdoors, and other exhibits and activities (including occasional aircraft rides nearby), the AirVenture Museum is a key tourist attraction in Oshkosh and is a center of activity throughout the AirVenture fly-in and airshow each summer. The museum is open year-round with the exception of a few holidays.

History
EAA founder Paul Poberezny proposed the idea of the EAA Air Museum-Air Education center in August 1958. In the late 1970s, his son, EAA president Tom Poberezny, led the campaign to build the current updated EAA museum and headquarters, which was officially opened in 1983.

The museum opened an Education Center in July 2022. The new building includes a Pilot Proficiency Center.

Features and exhibits
The museum's collection displays more than 200 aircraft and 20,000 artifacts, including civilian and military aircraft of historic importance, and aircraft popular with aviation hobbyists—vintage, homebuilt, racing and stunt aircraft.

Some of the more historic and unusual planes include a Curtiss Pusher, Bleriot XI, Curtiss Jenny, Pitcairn PCA-2 autogyro, Sikorsky S-38 amphibian flying boat, and the Taylor Aerocar flying car, as well various warbirds and Golden Age aircraft.

Other exhibits include functional replicas of the Wright Flyer and its predecessor, Octave Chanute's hang glider, French and German World War I fighters, Lindbergh's Ryan NYP "Spirit of St. Louis" replica (flown in the movie), and a replica of the historic Laird Super Solution 1931 racer.

A large section on Burt Rutan's aircraft includes a portion of his homebuilts, replicas of his globe-circling Rutan Voyager and the first private spacecraft, Space Ship One, crafted by Rutan's own shop.

The museum has a variety of donated aircraft, including the Church Midwing, Funk B, Monnett Moni, and many homebuilt and kitplane aircraft (some foreign)—many built by the original designers. Notable homebuilts on display consist of  Van's Aircraft's Van's RV-3, designed by Richard VanGrunsven, Christen Industries' Christen Eagle II, designed by Frank Christensen, and Cirrus Aircraft's first model, the Cirrus VK-30, designed by the Klapmeier brothers.

Pioneer Airport

Pioneer Airport is an old grass airstrip immediately behind the museum.

Rides 
Aircraft rides are offered through various EAA programs at the Museum's Pioneer Airport, or at the adjoining Wittman Field, especially during AirVenture Fly-In and Airshow, typically in late summer.

Ford Tri-Motor rides 
A 1920s/1930s vintage Ford Tri-Motor airliner sells rides occasionally at adjoining Wittman Field.  A particular program is the Fall Colors Flights, short flights to view colorful fall foliage in the area.

Boeing B-17 Flying Fortress rides 
The EAA's 1940s-vintage Boeing B-17 Flying Fortress World War II bomber, the Aluminum Overcast, sells rides occasionally at adjoining Wittman Field.

Helicopter rides 
Helicopter rides, typically in  Bell 47 ("MASH") helicopters are available occasionally at adjacent Pioneer Airport, or from adjoining Wittman Field.

Children's section
The museum includes a children's section which provides extensive hands-on aviation-related exhibits and activities, most notably, a 1/2 scale F-22 Raptor model, numerous flight simulators, and a "control tower" observation platform overlooking Pioneer Airport.

Library 
The EAA library has been open to EAA members since 1985.

Location 
The EAA Museum is near the northwest corner of the grounds of Wittman Regional Airport, on the southeast side of the interchange connecting Interstate 41 with Wisconsin state highways 44 and 91.

See also
Historic Aircraft Restoration Museum
List of aerospace museums
Mitchell Gallery of Flight
Young Eagles program

References

External links 

EAA Young Eagles website

Experimental Aircraft Association
Aerospace museums in Wisconsin
Museums in Oshkosh, Wisconsin
Military and war museums in Wisconsin
Institutions accredited by the American Alliance of Museums